Aristotelis is a municipality in the Chalkidiki regional unit, Central Macedonia, Greece. The seat of the municipality is the town Ierissos. The municipality is named after the ancient philosopher Aristotle, whose birthplace, Stagira, lies within its bounds. The municipality also includes the area of the mining villages, known as Mademochoria.

Municipality 
The municipality Aristotelis was formed at the 2011 local government reform by the merger of the following 3 former municipalities, that became municipal units:
Arnaia
Panagia
Stagira-Akanthos

The municipality has an area of 747.015 km2.

References

External links

Municipalities of Central Macedonia
Populated places in Chalkidiki